Leueen MacGrath (3 July 1914 – 27 March 1992) was an English actress and playwright and the second wife of George S. Kaufman, from 1949 until their divorce in 1957.

Early years
Born in London, England, MacGrath was a graduate of the Royal Academy of Dramatic Art.

Career
MacGrath (pronounced mac-GRAW) began her acting career with a small role in the 1936 British film Whom the Gods Love, a biopic about Mozart and his wife Constanze. She followed this with Pygmalion and a series of B-movies, including All Hands, Meet Maxwell Archer, and The Saint's Vacation.

MacGrath made her Broadway debut in 1948 in the play Edward, My Son (1948); she reprised her role (which she also had in the play's London production) in the film adaptation the following year. During this time she began a relationship with playwright and director George S. Kaufman. They married on 26 May 1949. Kaufman directed her in Jean Giraudoux's The Enchanted at the Lyceum, which closed after 45 performances. In 1951 she collaborated with Kaufman and Heywood Hale Broun on the writing of The Small Hours, which closed after 20 performances. The following year she and her husband scripted the even less successful play about reincarnation, Fancy Meeting You Again in which she starred with a young Walter Matthau and which ran for only 8 performances. The couple finally achieved a hit in 1955 with Silk Stockings, the Cole Porter musical for which they co-wrote the book with Abe Burrows. She returned to acting for Giraudoux's Tiger at the Gates and The Potting Shed.

Having settled in the United States following her marriage to Kaufman, MacGrath appeared in a number of American anthology television series popular in the 1950s, including The Philco Television Playhouse, Studio One, Lux Video Theatre, The United States Steel Hour, The Alcoa Hour, and Hallmark Hall of Fame.

Personal life
MacGrath married Kaufman on 26 May 1949, at Kaufman's home in Bucks County, Pennsylvania. They collaborated on several scripts and productions together. They divorced in 1957 and McGrath returned to the United Kingdom. In 1958 she returned to New York to help tend Kaufman after his second stroke, but declined to remarry him. Subsequently, she resumed her career in the United States.

She was married five times. In addition to Kaufman, her husbands were Christopher Burn, Desmond Davis, Stephen Goodyear, and Stephen Quinto.

Death
On 27 March 1992, MacGrath died of complications from a stroke at her home in London at the age of 77. She was survived by a sister and a stepdaughter.

Filmography

References

External links
 
 
 

1914 births
1992 deaths
British stage actresses
British film actresses
British television actresses
British women dramatists and playwrights
Actresses from London
20th-century British actresses
20th-century British dramatists and playwrights
Writers from London
20th-century British women writers
20th-century English women
20th-century English people